Khanya Mkangisa (born 13 March 1988), is a South African actress. She is best known for her roles in series such as Isidingo, Shattered, Step Up to a Start Up and Harvest. She is also a television presenter and DJ. She is best known as a YoTv presenter during the early 2000's.

Personal life
Khanya was born on the 13 March 1988 in Peddie, South Africa. She is a graduate of AFDA, The School for the Creative Economy.

She has been linked to rapper J Molly, who is 10 years younger than her. These rumors started in October 2019.

Career
At the age of 14, she got her big break on television and became a YoTv presenter on Sabc1. After being on YoTv she moved onto an educational science show called Knock Knock. In 2004, she made an appearance on the series Mthunzini.Com and thereafter moved on to star in The Lab1 as 'Refilwe' and then onto Ugugu noAndile. She also presented a show called Shield Teen. She had supporting roles in popular tv shows namely Zone 14 in 2011 and Intersexions in 2012. In 2012, she acted in the BBC production Mad Dogs III as the character 'Anna'. In 2013 she joined the cast of the series Zabalaza as a regular and played the role of 'Mpilo'.

In 2019, she made her debut as a DJ and performed at the Jozi to Quilox weekend festival in Lagos, Nigeria. In 2020 she made her debut in the popular soapie Muvhango playing the role of 'Mbali'.

Filmography

References

External links
 
 

Living people
South African television actresses
1988 births
South African film actresses